This is a list of events in British radio during 2006.

Events

January
 16 January – FM102 The Bear in Stratford-upon-Avon and Kix 96 in Coventry are merged and relaunched as Touch FM
 23 January – Former XFM presenter Christian O'Connell joins Virgin Radio to present The Christian O'Connell Breakfast Show.

February
February – The A List launches on Heart, Real Radio and Century FM. Featuring adult contemporary music, the programme is presented by Melanie Sykes and Nick Snaith.
 6 February – BRMB's second "Two Strangers and a Wedding" competition ends with the marriage of Craig Cooper and Rebecca Duffy at Birmingham's Hotel du Vin.
 28 February – Radio 2 Drivetime presenter Johnnie Walker announces he will leave the show after seven years. He will present his last show on 31 March.

March
 2 March – Chris Evans is announced as Johnnie Walker's replacement on BBC Radio 2's Drivetime show from April.
 8 March – Radio 1 launches its YouTube channel.

April
 3 April – BBC GMR reverts to its original name of BBC Radio Manchester.
 9 April – Russell Brand presents his first Saturday night Russell Brand Show on BBC Radio 2.
 18 April – Chris Evans takes over Radio 2's Drivetime show from Johnnie Walker.
 19 April – 
London's 102.2 Smooth FM gives away £118,454 to a listener from Essex who correctly identifies their Secret Song as Diana Ross's My Old Piano. The Secret Song has been running since November 2005 and, at this time is the biggest cash prize on radio this century.
Insight Radio is rebranded as RNIB Connect Radio.
 23 April – The Radio 4 UK Theme is used for the last time, amid controversy over its axing by Radio 4 controller Mark Damazer. The decision to axe the theme, which had been used since 1978, to make way for a 'pacy news briefing' led to widespread coverage in the media and even debate in Parliament. 
 29 April – In some areas Centre FM is renamed as Touch FM.
 April – The timeslot for Bob Harris's Saturday evening show on Radio 2 is moved forward an hour, meaning it airs from 11pm to 2am instead of 10pm to 1am.

May
No events

June
24 June – The final edition of Home Truths is broadcast on BBC Radio 4.
June – Nick Clarke broadcasts Fighting to Be Normal on BBC Radio 4, an audio diary of his treatment for cancer. In August he returns to presenting The World at One on the network, but his last appearance is on 12 September and he dies on 23 November.

July
 25 July – A Secret Song competition on Manchester's 100.4 Smooth FM is won by a listener who correctly identifies the track as Razzamatazz by Quincy Jones. The competition had been running since 27 March with the prize money standing at £86,500 at the time it was won.
 July – Networking is increased on the north of England Magic stations when the local afternoon show is dropped in favour of a networked programme. Consequently, only the breakfast show is locally produced.

August
27 August – Sue Lawley presents her final edition of BBC Radio 4's Desert Island Discs after eighteen years. Her last castaway is the actress Joan Plowright.

September
6 September – Kiss 100 is relaunched after a decline in listening figures, dance stations Vibe 101 and Vibe 105-108 are also rebranded to Kiss.
16 September – Saturday Live, Home Truths replacement show on BBC Radio 4, begins with Fi Glover as presenter.

October
1 October – Kirsty Young takes over as presenter of Desert Island Discs. Her first guest is children's author and illustrator Quentin Blake.
10 October – Talksport becomes the first national commercial radio broadcaster to win Premier League commentary rights. Talksport wins a package that allows it to broadcast the second choice Saturday afternoon games that kick off at 3pm – the BBC will get first pick.
22 October – A new chart show called Fresh 40 launches. Aired on the Kiss and Galaxy networks and other youth-orientated stations, it counts down the top 40 r’n’b and dance songs and is broadcast against commercial radio's Hit40uk chart programme and the BBC Radio 1 Sunday afternoon chart show.

November
 3 November – Charles Wood's play The Conspiracy of Sèvres (about the 1956 Suez Crisis) is broadcast.
 18 November – Russell Brand joins Radio 2 to present a regular weekly programme.
 November – CTR 105.6 in Maidstone, Kent, is purchased by the KM Group, taking the number of KM-owned stations in Kent to 7.

December
 December – GMG Radio purchases the Saga Radio Group.

Unknown
Galaxy 102.2 is renamed Galaxy Birmingham in line with other Galaxy radio stations.
Sport on 5 is renamed 5 live Sport.

Station debuts

14 February – Talk 107
25 February – Touch FM (Banbury)
29 June – 99.9 Radio Norwich
10 July – Yorkshire Radio
15 August – Gaydio
2 September – Brunel FM
1 October – Original 106 (Solent)
16 October – 107.3 Abbey FM
18 December – Radio Music Shop
25 December – theJazzGCap Media inc Regulatory Announcement. Published by the London Stock Exchange on November 28, 2006. Accessed December 18, 2009

Closing this year

Programme debuts
 3 January – The Geoff Show on Virgin Radio (2006–2008)
 23 January – The Christian O'Connell Breakfast Show on Virgin Radio (later Absolute Radio) (2006–present)
 9 April – The Russell Brand Show on BBC 6 Music (later BBC Radio 2) (2006–2008, 2010, 1013, 2017–present)
 18 April – Chris Evans Drivetime on BBC Radio 2 (2006–2009)
 12 July – The Personality Test on BBC Radio 4 (2006–2007)
 25 August – Jest a Minute on BBC Radio Wales (2006–2009)
 September – The Dream Ticket with Joe Mace on BBC 6 Music (2006–2007)
 8 September – 1966 and All That on BBC Radio 4 (2006)
 18 October – The Unbelievable Truth on BBC Radio 4 (2006–present)
 14 November – Living with the Enemy on BBC Radio 4 (2006)
 Unknown – The Bottom Line on BBC Radio 4 (2006–present)

Continuing radio programmes
1940s
 Sunday Half Hour (1940–2018)
 Desert Island Discs (1942–present)
 Woman's Hour (1946–present)
 A Book at Bedtime (1949–present)

1950s
 The Archers (1950–present)
 The Today Programme (1957–present)
 Your Hundred Best Tunes (1959–2007)

1960s
 Farming Today (1960–present)
 In Touch (1961–present)
 The World at One (1965–present)
 The Official Chart (1967–present)
 Just a Minute (1967–present)
 The Living World (1968–present)
 The Organist Entertains (1969–2018)

1970s
 PM (1970–present)
 Start the Week (1970–present)
 You and Yours (1970–present)
 I'm Sorry I Haven't a Clue (1972–present)
 Good Morning Scotland (1973–present)
 Newsbeat (1973–present)
 File on 4 (1977–present)
 Money Box (1977–present)
 The News Quiz (1977–present)
 Feedback (1979–present)
 The Food Programme (1979–present)
 Science in Action (1979–present)

1980s
 Steve Wright in the Afternoon (1981–1993, 1999–present)
 In Business (1983–present)
 Sounds of the 60s (1983–present)
 Loose Ends (1986–present)

1990s
 The Moral Maze (1990–present)
 Essential Selection (1991–present)
 No Commitments (1992–2007)
 Wake Up to Wogan (1993–2009)
 Essential Mix (1993–present)
 Up All Night (1994–present)
 Wake Up to Money (1994–present)
 Private Passions (1995–present)
 Parkinson's Sunday Supplement (1996–2007)
 The David Jacobs Collection (1996–2013)
 Sunday Night at 10 (1998–2013)
 In Our Time (1998–present)
 Material World (1998–present)
 Scott Mills (1998–present)
 The Now Show (1998–present)
 Jonathan Ross (1999–2010)

2000s
 Dead Ringers (2000–2007, 2014–present)
 BBC Radio 2 Folk Awards (2000–present)
 Sounds of the 70s (2000–2008''', 2009–present)
 Big John @ Breakfast (2000–present)
 Parsons and Naylor's Pull-Out Sections (2001–2007)
 Jammin' (2001–2008)
 Go4It (2001–2009)
 The Jo Whiley Show (2001–2011)
 Kermode and Mayo's Film Review (2001–present)
 The Big Toe Radio Show (2002–2011)
 A Kist o Wurds (2002–present)
 The Day the Music Died (2003–2007)
 Fighting Talk (2003–present)
 Jeremy Vine (2003–present)
 Trevor's World of Sport (2004–2007)
 The Chris Moyles Breakfast Show (2004–2012)
 Annie Mac (2004–present)
 Elaine Paige on Sunday (2004–present)

Ending this year
 22 June – It's Been a Bad Week (1999–2006)
 31 March – Drivetime with Johnnie Walker (1998–2006)
 4 July – Mitch Benn's Crimes Against Music (2004–2006)
 10 August – The Dream Ticket with Nemone (2005–2006)
 29 September – 1966 and All That (2006)
 19 December – Living with the Enemy (2006)

Deaths
1 February – Ernest Dudley, 97, novelist, journalist, screenwriter, actor and radio broadcaster
27 February – Linda Smith, 48, comedian
19 April – June Knox-Mawer, 75, romantic novelist and radio broadcaster
5 October – Robert Dentith, 29, presenter of The Unsigned Show'' on Kerrang! Radio
21 October – Paul Walters, 59, BBC radio and TV producer
31 October – William Franklyn, 81, actor
23 November – Nick Clarke, 58, radio and television presenter and journalist
27 November – Alan Freeman, 79, disc jockey and radio personality
18 December – Mike Dickin, 63, talkSPORT radio presenter (car accident)

References

Radio
British Radio, 2006 In
Years in British radio